Magkano Ba ang Pag-ibig? (International title: Wealth and Passion / ) is a Philippine television drama romance series broadcast by GMA Network. Directed by Maryo J. de los Reyes, it stars Heart Evangelista. It premiered on September 30, 2013, on the network's Afternoon Prime line up replacing Maghihintay Pa Rin. The series concluded on February 14, 2014, with a total of 100 episodes. It was replaced by Innamorata in its timeslot.

Cast and characters

Lead cast
 Heart Evangelista as Eloisa Aguirre

Supporting cast
 Sid Lucero as Luciano "Lucio" Aragon / Chino Aguirre
 Dominic Roco as Bobby Buenaventura
 Katrina Halili as Margarita "Margot" Cruz
 Alessandra de Rossi as Geraldine "Gigi" Buenaventura
 Isabel Oli as Richelle Mangahas
 Ana Capri as Lualhati Macaraeg
 Pen Medina as Andoy
 Shamaine Centenera-Buencamino as Loida Aguirre
 Luz Valdez as Rosing Villasanta
 Vangie Labalan as Sonia Aguirre
 Rommel Padilla as Oscar Ramos
 Celia Rodriguez as Doña Hilaria Buenaventura

Guest cast
 Ella Cruz as young Eloisa
 Francis Magundayao as young Lucio
 Kiel Rodriguez as young Chino
 Leandro Baldemor as young Bobby
 Mona Louise Rey as young Gigi
 Lloyd Samartino as young Lualhati
 Jillian Ward as young Richelle

Ratings
According to AGB Nielsen Philippines' Mega Manila household television ratings, the pilot episode of Magkano Ba ang Pag-ibig? earned a 12.4% rating. While the final episode scored a 15.9% rating.

Accolades

References

External links
 

2013 Philippine television series debuts
2014 Philippine television series endings
Filipino-language television shows
GMA Network drama series
Philippine romance television series
Television shows set in Quezon City